Eardulf of Lindisfarne (died 900) was Bishop of Lindisfarne for 46 years between 854, following the death of his predecessor, and his own death in 899.  He was chiefly responsible for removing the remains of St Cuthbert from Lindisfarne to protect them from Viking invasions, eventually resettling them in Chester-le-Street and temporarily running the see from there.

According to legend, Eardulf and Eadred, former abbot of Carlisle attempted to take Cuthbert's remains to Ireland for safety, however as they attempted to take the bones on board a ship at Workington, a violent storm blew up and all the water that fell on the ship turned immediately to blood, which was taken as a sign of disapproval from Cuthbert himself.

During their seven years of wandering with Cuthbert's remains the monks were also known to have visited Galloway and stayed in a cave now known as St Cuthbert's Cave near Dunstanburgh Castle in Northumberland.

Citations

References
 Caves of Britain accessed on 29 August 2007
 Explore Low Furness accessed on 29 August 2007

External links
 

900 deaths
Bishops of Lindisfarne
9th-century English bishops
English Christian monks
Year of birth unknown